Decatur Public Schools is a public school district in Van Buren County in the U.S. state of Michigan, based in Decatur, Michigan.

Schools
The Decatur Public Schools School District has one elementary school, one middle school, and one high school.

Elementary school
Decatur Elementary School

Middle school
Decatur Middle School

High school
Decatur High School

References

External links
 

School districts in Michigan
Education in Van Buren County, Michigan